Francis Albert De Martini (March 31, 1952 – September 11, 2001) was an American architect employed by the Port Authority of New York, the agency that managed the World Trade Center, who died in the September 11 attacks of 2001.

De Martini, who started working at the twin towers when hired to assess the damage from the 1993 World Trade Center bombing, became the construction manager and was in charge of the changing of indoor layouts such as wall removal and plumbing rearrangement at request by the occupants.

On September 11, 2001, De Martini and his colleagues Pablo Ortiz, Peter Negron, and Carlos da Costa, worked in offices on the 88th floor of the North Tower of the complex, the first tower to be struck in the attacks. De Martini and his coworkers had all arrived early and were sharing a coffee with De Martini's wife Nicole when American Airlines Flight 11, which had been hijacked by terrorists, struck their building just a few floors above them at 8:46 A.M. The men helped clear the entrance to one of the building's three stairwells and directed their fellow occupants to descend to safety. De Martini assured his wife he would follow her.  But the four men then proceeded to find and rescue dozens of people. They ascended to the 89th floor, and bashed through drywall next to a blocked door, allowing the occupants of that floor to escape.

When the building was hit all the elevators stopped. Passengers in those elevators had to be rescued by workers from the outside, and the four men proceeded to execute those rescues. It has been estimated that at least 50 people survived the attack due to the rescue efforts of De Martini and his colleagues. When they arrived on the 89th floor De Martini directed Mak Hanna to carry an elderly man down to safety.  De Martini, Ortiz, Negron and da Costa all perished when the North Tower collapsed at 10:28 A.M. Hanna was the only one of their crew to survive.

Accounts of De Martini's actions during the attacks were given in the documentaries 9/11: The Twin Towers and 102 Minutes That Changed America.

See also
 Edna Cintron
 Melissa Doi
 Kevin Cosgrove

References

Victims of the September 11 attacks
People from New York City
20th-century American architects
1952 births
2001 deaths
21st-century American architects
Port Authority of New York and New Jersey people